Dan Coats is a politician from the state of Indiana and a member of the Republican Party. He served four terms in the United States House of Representatives, representing Indiana's 4th congressional district from 1981 to 1989. In 1989, he was appointed to the United States Senate by Indiana Gov. Robert D. Orr following U.S. Sen. Dan Quayle's resignation from the Senate due to Quayle's election as Vice President of the United States. Coats served in the Senate from 1989 to 1999 and again from 2011 to 2017. Coats served as the 5th Director of National Intelligence from March 2017-August 2019.

Background
Coats's political history in Indiana is closely tied to Quayle and former Senator Evan Bayh. Coats immediately succeeded Quayle both in the U.S. House of Representatives in 1981 (following Quayle upset victory over incumbent Sen. Birch Bayh in 1980) and in the U.S. Senate (following Quayle election as Vice President in 1988). Afters Coats decided to not seek re-election in 1998, he was succeeded by Evan Bayh, who reclaimed his father's old Senate seat. Following Bayh's retirement in 2010, Coats was re-elected to his old seat. He did not seek reelection in 2016.

United States House of Representatives

United States Senate

External links

Senator Dan Coats official U.S. Senate website

Coats